Cornett is a hamlet in the English county of Herefordshire.

It lies on the main A417 road southeast of the town of Leominster.

External links 

Villages in Herefordshire